Jamila Anna Schäfer (born 30 April 1993) is a German politician of Alliance 90/The Greens who has been serving as a member of the German Bundestag since the 2021 elections, representing the Munich South district. From 2018 to 2022 she served as one of her party's deputy chairs, under the leadership of Annalena Baerbock and Robert Habeck

Early life 
Born to a physiotherapist and a computer scientist, Schäfer grew up in Munich’s Großhadern district. In 2012 she started a law degree at Ludwig Maximilian University of Munich, which she did not complete. Since 2013 she is studying sociology with a minor in philosophy at Ludwig Maximilian University of Munich and Goethe University Frankfurt which she had not completed as of February 2022

Political career 
From 2015 to 2017, Schäfer served as chair of the Green Youth, the Green Party’s youth organisation.

From 2018 to 2022, Schäfer was part of the Green Party’s national leadership around co-chairs Annalena Baerbock and Robert Habeck,  where she coordinated the party’s activities on European and international affairs.

Schäfer was elected Member of the Bundestag for Munich South in the 2021 German federal election.

In the negotiations to form a so-called traffic light coalition of the Social Democratic Party (SPD), the Green Party and the Free Democratic Party (FDP) following the elections, Schäfer was part of her party's delegation in the working group on European affairs, co-chaired by Udo Bullmann, Franziska Brantner and Nicola Beer.

In parliament, Schäfer has been serving on the Budget Committee (since 2021), the Committee on Foreign Affairs (since 2021) and the Subcommittee on the United Nations (since 2022). On the Budget Committee, she is her parliamentary group’s rapporteur on the annual budget of the Federal Foreign Office. She is also a member of the so-called Confidential Committee (Vertrauensgremium) of the Budget Committee, which provides budgetary supervision for Germany's three intelligence services, BND, BfV and MAD.

Other activities 
 Heinrich Böll Foundation, Member of the General Assembly

Political positions 
Within the Green Party, Schäfer is considered to be part of its left wing. She is a vegetarian.

Controversy 
In early 2022, Schäfer became one of the six subjects of an embezzlement investigation launched by the Berlin public prosecutor’s office into the entire leadership board of the Green Party over the payment of so-called ‘corona bonuses,’ which had been paid in 2020 to all employees of the party’s federal office and at the same time to its board.

Personal life 
Schäfer lives in Berlin’s Weissensee district.

References 

Living people
1993 births
Politicians from Munich
Members of the Bundestag 2021–2025
21st-century German women politicians
Members of the Bundestag for Alliance 90/The Greens
Female members of the Bundestag
German women environmentalists